Margaret Barr may refer to:

 Margaret Barr (choreographer)
 Margaret Elizabeth Barr-Bigelow, mycologist